Gerbino is a surname. Notable people with the surname include:

Jeff Gerbino (born 1953), American stand-up comedian
Lian Gerbino (born 1983), Argentine musician
Luca Gerbino Polo (born 1987), Italian footballer